This list of protected areas of Helsingør Municipality is a list of protected areas of Helsingør Municipality, Denmark.

List

See also
 List of protected areas of Gribskov Municipality
 Danish Outdoor Council
Gelsingør
 List of protected areas of Hillerød Municipality

Helsingør Municipality